This is a list of the squads of the seven franchise teams which will compete in the 2022 Kashmir Premier League, a 20-over cricket league. The draft took place on 21 July 2022 in Islamabad. The tournament will be held in Muzaffarabad.

Key

Bagh Stallions

Jammu Janbaz

Kotli Lions

Mirpur Royals

Muzaffarabad Tigers

Overseas Warriors

Rawalakot Hawks

References

Kashmir Premier League (Pakistan)